Pamela Jane Bjorkman NAS, AAAS (also spelled Pamela J. Björkman born 1956 in Portland, Oregon) is an American biochemist. She is the David Baltimore Professor of Biology and Biological Engineering at the California Institute of Technology (Caltech),  Her research centers on the study of the three-dimensional structures of proteins related to Class I MHC, or Major Histocompatibility Complex, proteins of the immune system and proteins involved in the immune responses to viruses . Bjorkman is most well known as a pioneer in the field of structural biology.

Bjorkman earned a Bachelor of Arts degree in Chemistry at the University of Oregon, under the guidance of Hayes Griffith and Patricia Jost.  She received her PhD in biochemistry at Harvard University in 1984, where she worked in the laboratory of Don Wiley. She stayed on in Wiley's lab in a postdoctoral position where she ultimately solved the first crystal structure of an MHC protein - the HLA-A2 human histocompatibility antigen.  This work was published in 1987, first at 3.5Å resolution (PDB entry 1HLA) and then refined at 2.6Å (PDB entry 3HLA). Bjorkman continued her postdoctoral research at Stanford University in the laboratory of Mark Davis, studying the T-cell receptors that recognize antigens presented in the binding groove of MHC proteins. In 1989, she joined the Biology faculty at the California Institute of Technology as an assistant professor.  She earned tenure as an associate professor in 1995 and was promoted to full professor in 1998. She was an HHMI investigator from 1989–2015.

The Bjorkman laboratory is interested in immune recognition of viral pathogens in order to develop improved therapeutics against rapidly-evolving viruses such as HIV-1. They use X-ray crystallography, cryo-electron microscopy, and biochemistry to study pathogen envelope glycoproteins and host immune response proteins. Using structural information and alternate antibody architectures, they are engineering antibody-based reagents with increased potency and breadth. They are also investigating the structural correlates of broad and potent antibody-mediated neutralization of HIV-1 to better understand what leads to naturally-occurring broad and potent antibodies. In related work, they use 3D imaging techniques such as electron tomography and fluorescent microscopy to investigate HIV/SIV infection in animal and human tissues.

Pamela Bjorkman's Erdős number is two, based on publication of a structural and mathematical analysis of the symmetry of insect ferritin with mathematician Peter Hamburger.  

Bjorkman is married to the neurobiologist Kai Zinn, also a full professor at Caltech.  Bjorkman and Zinn have two children.

Awards 
 1989 Pew Scholar in the Biomedical  Sciences by the Pew Charitable Trusts
 1993 Cancer Research Institute William B. Coley Award
 1994 Gairdner Foundation International Award (jointly with Don Wiley)
 1994 James R. Klinenberg Science Award from the Arthritis Foundation
 1996 AAI-PharMingen Investigator Award
 1996 Paul Ehrlich and Ludwig Darmstaedter Prize
 1997 Fellow of the American Academy of Arts and Sciences
 1997 James R. Klinenberg Science Award from the Arthritis Foundation
 2001 Member of the National Academy of Sciences
 2002 Max Planck Research Award
2002 Member of the American Philosophical Society
 2004 Rose Payne Distinguished Scientist Award
 2006 L'Oreal-UNESCO Women in Science
 2010 National Institute of Health Director's Pioneer Award
 2021 Greengard Prize

References

External links
Bio of Bjorkman
Description at the Howard Hughes Medical Institute
Björkman Research Group at HHMI
American Association of Immunologists

1956 births
American women biochemists
American biophysicists
Women biophysicists
Fellows of the American Academy of Arts and Sciences
Harvard Graduate School of Arts and Sciences alumni
Howard Hughes Medical Investigators
L'Oréal-UNESCO Awards for Women in Science laureates
Living people
Members of the United States National Academy of Sciences
Stanford University postdoctoral scholars
University of Oregon alumni
University of Southern California faculty
20th-century American women scientists
21st-century American women scientists
American women academics
Members of the American Philosophical Society